Sızma is a rural locality (a selo) in Sizemskoye Rural Settlement, Sheksninsky District, Vologda Oblast, Russia. The population was 233 as of 2002. There are 5 streets.

Geography 
Sızma is located 63 km north of Sheksna (the district's administrative centre) by road. Zverinets is the nearest rural locality.

References 

Rural localities in Sheksninsky District
Vologodsky Uyezd